The 1908 Carlisle Indians football team represented the Carlisle Indian Industrial School as an independent during the 1908 college football season. Led by seventh-year head coach Pop Warner, the Indians compiled a record of 10–2–1 and outscored opponents 222 to 55. Warner's team ran the single-wing on offense.

Schedule

See also
 1908 College Football All-America Team

References

Carlisle
Carlisle Indians football seasons
Carlisle Indians football